Before I Die is a 2007 young adult novel by Jenny Downham.

Before I Die may also refer to:
"Before I Die" (Eamon song), 2017
"Before I Die" (Papa Roach song), 2013
Before I Die (Playhouse 90), a 1958 American television film
Before I Die (film), an upcoming British film in Bangla and English
"Before I Die" (short story), a 1947 Nero Wolfe mystery novella by Rex Stout